The Highway 61 Film Festival is an annual film festival held in Pine City, Minnesota. The festival was established in 2011 to show movies representing excellence in filmmaking, particularly those rare independent films and documentaries by both noted and new filmmakers, that do not receive mainstream distribution.  The name of the festival comes from and highlights U.S. Route 61, especially U.S. Route 61 in Minnesota.

The Highway 61 Film Festival is sponsored by a non-profit organization, Pine Center for the Arts, and is funded by businesses, community groups and individuals, plus ticket sales for the various film sessions. The festival is headed by a committee of Pine City area film enthusiasts, writers, directors, and creative professionals.

The 2011 and 2012 Highway 61 Film Festivals were held over the span of three days, Friday through Sunday, and featured many independent shorts and features.  They were shown at the Pine Technical & Community College Auditorium as well as at a supper club and events center called Beach Rocks on the north shore of Pokegama Lake.  In 2011, the festival showed films taken by Shane Bauer prior to his detainment.  In 2012, the Minneapolis–Saint Paul International Film Festival founder, Al Milgrom, presented some of his works and photographer Wing Young Huie attended to see some of his inspired works projected on buildings in an accompanying event called "Photos on Buildings" nearby.

Official selections

2014
216 Months
Int. Café–Night
Little Things

2013
Tales of the Road: Highway 61  
Les Esclaves  
Useful. Valid. True 
Sled Dogs to St. Paul 
Honor Among Thieves  
Maze 
Our Killing Time 
Two Stiffs  
Rocket Surgeons 
Deadly Love 
The Healing Musical 
Iter Ad Terram Promissionis  
Coffea – The Coffee Fairy 
Syren  
The American Road 
The Information Thief  
Aakhir (At Last) 
Not Like the Commercials 
The Panhandler 
McMeta 
Small Steps
Lima Syndrome 
The Elevator 
For Ashley 
Another Saturday Night 
Problem Solving the Republic 
Sunrise's Favorite Son 
Escape from Schwartz's Bakery 
Keeper 
Misiek and the Bloody Monitor 
Hairdo or DIE: The First Cut 
The Giant Spider

2012
Wild Bill's Run
The Long Push
Incidental
We Juke Up In Here!
Labor Day
Steele Vengeance
In Harm's Way
The Paper Jam
The Heart of a Book
Burmese Python
Adventure Under the Sea
Dangerous Days
Glory and Death: Amundsen and Scott's Race to the South Pole
The Highway Walkers
Restraint
The Interview
Memorial Day
Trade for Magic
Goin’ With the Flo
Shattered Glass
Foreign Love
Case #377
Snow White
The Dream
The Cabin
House of Ghosts

2011
What If?
Boundary Waters
Five Bucks Til Friday
Stories Next Door
Lumber Jill
Songs to Enemies and Deserts
Recreation
All Over the Walls
True Story of Peter Pan
Night Surf
Cocainine
Your Mother's a Hunt
Hunting Buddies
Rhythm Sticks
Spaceman from Space
Whistle
Underwater Ocean Visit
Welcome to America: 50 states in 50 days
Ink Blots
Out of Character
Games Men Play
Cento
Sun Gods
Masquerade
Payback Time
Harold Crumb
Lambent Fuse
Love Notes
Stitches
Bloodshed Love
Roadside Assistance
Dope Sick
Birthmarked for Death
Ghost from the Machine
The Missing Frame
Attack of the Moon Zombies
Some Fangs
Potpourri

References

External links
Official Site – Highway 61 Film Festival

Film festivals in Minnesota